Coleophora subapicis is a moth of the family Coleophoridae. It is found in the United States, including Kentucky.

The larvae feed on the seeds of Aster infirmus. They create a trivalved, tubular silken case.

References

subapicis
Moths of North America
Moths described in 1940